Kaitinano Mwemweata (born July 22, 1984) is an I-Kiribati athlete. She was the first person ever to compete for Kiribati at the Olympic Games, when she represented her country at the 100 metre sprint in Athens in 2004.

Mwemweata finished seventh out of eight in her heat, achieving a personal best of 13.07.

She was due to represent Kiribati again at the 2008 Summer Olympics in Beijing, competing in the 200 metre sprint, but had to withdraw after contracting tuberculosis. She was undergoing treatment at the time of the Games.

She won gold in the long jump at the Micronesian Championships, in Koror in 2003. She also took part in the World Athletics Championships in Edmonton in 2001.

At the Kiribati National Games of 2006, Mwemweata won a bronze medal in the shot put, a silver medal in the high jump, and four gold medals in long jump, the 100 metre sprint, the 200 metre sprint and the triple jump.

Achievements

References

External links
 
Sports reference biography

1984 births
Living people
I-Kiribati female sprinters
Athletes (track and field) at the 2004 Summer Olympics
Olympic athletes of Kiribati
People from the Gilbert Islands
Olympic female sprinters